Odo of Deuil (1110 – 18 April 1162), his first name also spelled Odon, Eude or Eudes, was a French historian of and participant in the Second Crusade (1147–1149).

Born at Deuil to a modest family, he became a monk and was a confidant of Suger, abbot of Saint-Denis. He took part in the Second Crusade in 1147, and served as the chaplain of Louis VII on the expedition.

His narrative of the Crusade is entitled De profectione Ludovici VII in Orientem (On Louis VII's journey to the East), which relates the progress of the crusade from France to Antioch. It was written so that Suger could compose a history of Louis' life. Eudes explains the failure of the crusade in terms of human action rather than as the will of God, in contrast to the reasoning of Otto of Freising. His aims were to glorify Louis, but also to provide a guide for future crusaders so that the mistakes of the Second Crusade would not be repeated.

Eudes blamed the Byzantine Empire under Manuel Comnenus for the downfall of the crusade. Eudes' prejudice against Byzantium led Runciman to describe Eudes as "hysterically anti-Greek." However, Phillips has recently argued that Eudes' view of Byzantium was possibly rooted in ideological differences which minor skirmishes between the crusaders and Greeks had brought to the fore. His prejudice should also be set against the experience of Conrad III of Germany, who wrote that Manuel treated him as a "brother."

Eudes' account ends with the remnant of the crusade arriving at Antioch, and so does not include a description of the Siege of Damascus.

He returned to France and became abbot of Saint-Denis in 1151.

Notes

Sources 
Odo of Deuil, De profectione Ludovici VII in Orientem, tr. V.G. Berry (New York: W.W. Norton and Co., 1948).
J. Phillips, "Odo of Deuil's De profectione Ludovici VII in Orientem as a source for the Second Crusade", in M. Bull et al. (eds), The Experience of Crusading, 2 Vols (Cambridge: Cambridge University Press, 2003), 1.80-95.
S. Runciman, A History of the Crusades, 3 Vols (London: Cambridge University Press, 1951-4).

External links
Odo of Deuil at Crusades Encyclopedia
Extracts from the De profectione
Letters concerning the Second Crusade

1110 births
1162 deaths
Medieval writers about the Crusades
12th-century Latin writers
12th-century French historians
French abbots
French male non-fiction writers
Crusades chaplains
Christians of the Second Crusade
Travelers in Asia Minor